Secrets of the Beehive is a solo album by British singer-songwriter David Sylvian and it was released on 19 October 1987 (in Europe, UK and America). The album peaked at no.37 in the UK album chart. The album was released in Japan on 21 November 1987.

Background 

The entire album was quickly written in about two inspired weeks shortly after Sylvian's extensive press tour for Gone to Earth, but for the recording Sylvian ran out of budget and was unable to complete the album the way he envisioned it. Although Sylvian said he liked the songs on the album, he described it as a failure because the centerpiece of the album was missing. The missing piece was the song "Ride", which was later completed and finally released 2000 on the compilation album "Everything and Nothing". Sylvian said : "I was crushed when I wasn't able to finish it first time around due to time and budget constraints."

Sylvian spent the first couple of months of 1987 making demo tapes of songs that would draw on the subtler sides of jazz, folk and orchestral music. Recorded in just 2.5 months “Secrets Of The Beehive” appeared in October 1987 to universally positive reviews. The emphasis was on the lyrical content more than on the previous albums. Because the material came so easily and had a certain strength in its simplicity, it didn’t require enhancing in terms of studio atmospherics and effects. Sylvian began recording the basic tracks at Chateau Miraval in the South of France because of its exotic location. David Torn, Danny Thompson, Ryuichi Sakamoto and Danny Cummings came down and built up the tracks one by one. In time they would be joined at the studio by Phil Palmer and Steve Jansen. The orchestral overdubs were recorded midway through the album, at Angel Studios and at Air in London. Sakamoto had scored the majority of the songs, except "Orpheus" and "Let the Happiness In", were scored by arranger Brian Gascoigne. Mark Isham also recorded his parts at Angel and Air Studios. Then it was off to Wisseloord at Hilversum in the Netherlands to finish the overdubs and do the vocals. Final additions and mixing were done early summer 1987 at the Wool Hall in Bath with Steve Nye.

In 2003, a remastered limited digipak version of 'Secrets of the Beehive' was released with the bonus track from the Japanese version 'Promise (The Cult of Eurydice)' replacing the original CD bonus track 'Forbidden Colours (version)', which was a re-recorded version of the Sakamoto/Sylvian collaboration originally intended for Brilliant Trees, but eventually released as b-side to the Red Guitar single. In 2006 it was reissued in a standard jewel-case.

In February 2019, as part of a redesigned monochrome sleeved vinyl reissue batch of his 80s albums, Secrets.. was released in a gatefold sleeve with different type fonts, but otherwise maintaining the original artwork.

Track listing

Personnel
David Sylvian – vocals, piano (1), acoustic guitar (2, 4, 6), organ (2, 8), synths (2, 3, 4, 5, 8, 10), tapes (3, 5), treated piano (5) 
Ryuichi Sakamoto – string arrangement (1, 2, 3, 6, 9, 10), organ (2, 3, 5, 7, 8), synths (2, 4, 8), piano (4, 5, 7, 9, 10), treated piano (3), woodwind arrangement (5), brass arrangement (8)
Steve Jansen – drums (4, 8, 10)
David Torn – electric guitar (2, 7), guitar loop (3)
Danny Thompson – double bass (2, 4, 7)
Danny Cummings – percussion (2, 6, 7, 8)
Phil Palmer – slide guitar (4), acoustic guitars (6)
Mark Isham – flugelhorn (4,8), trumpet (6, 8)
Brian Gascoigne – orchestral arrangement (4), string arrangement (8)
Ann O'Dell – string arrangement (10)

Technical personnel
Steve Nye – producer, mixing, engineer
David Sylvian – assistant producer, assistant mixing
Peter Williams – co-engineer (10)
Richard Moakes – second engineer
Steve Parker – second engineer
John Timperley – second engineer
Jean-Jacques Lemoine – assistant engineer
Roland Prent – assistant engineer
Steve Williams – assistant engineer
Richard Chadwick – recording co-ordinating
Catherine Wilson – assistant in recording
Vaughan Oliver (23 Envelope) – design, typography
Nigel Grierson (23 Envelope) – still life photography
Yuka Fujii – portrait photography

Charts

References

David Sylvian albums
1987 albums
Albums produced by Steve Nye
Virgin Records albums